Lapara coniferarum, the southern pine sphinx, is a species of sphinx moth. It was first described by James Edward Smith in 1797. The species is listed as threatened in Connecticut.

Distribution 
It is known from mixed and pine forests from Nova Scotia and Maine south to Florida, and west to Indiana and Louisiana.

Biology 
The larvae feed on Pinus species, including Pinus taeda and Pinus palustris.

References

External links
Species description Moths of America

Sphingini
Moths described in 1797